The IMOCA 60 Class yacht Spirit Of Yukoh V, JPN 11 also known as DMG Mori was designed by VPLP Design Office in partnership with Gurit for the structural design. The boat is a sistership to IMOCA 60 Charal but produced afterwards by Multiplast in France. The boat was launched on the 2nd September 2019.

Racing Results

References 

Individual sailing yachts
2010s sailing yachts
Sailing yachts designed by VPLP
Sailboat types built in France
Vendée Globe boats
IMOCA 60